Victorious Cupid is an oil painting, see Amor Vincit Omnia (Caravaggio).

Victorious Cupid may also refer to:
 "Victorious Cupid", another similar oil painting (Omnia vincit amor), see Master of the Gamblers
 "Victorious Cupid", a 2007 song by the rock group Pure Reason Revolution
 "Victorious Cupid", a 2009 album by Pure Reason Revolution, see Amor Vincit Omnia (Pure Reason Revolution album)

See also
 Love Conquers All (disambiguation)